Homoaconitatic acid (homoaconitate) is related to aconitic acid but with one extra carbon. It is part of the α-aminoadipate pathway for lysine biosynthesis, where it is made from homocitrate by homoaconitase.  It is converted to homoisocitrate by homoisocitrate dehydrogenase.

See also
 Homoisocitric acid

References

Tricarboxylic acids